Anthony Schuyler Arrott (born April 1, 1928) is an American-born Canadian physicist, Professor emeritus at Simon Fraser University. He is a specialist in condensed matter physics, physics of magnetism and liquid crystals. He is the author of over 200 scientific papers. Arrott is the subject of the 2020 documentary Portrait, directed by Lily Ekimian and A.T. Ragheb.

Research area
In 1957, he suggested a straightforward criterion for ferromagnetism from observations of magnetic isotherms.
This method was called Arrott plots.
In collaboration with Murray J. Press, he gave a description of surface singularities in liquid-crystal droplets.
A lot of works are devoted to the properties of ferromagnetic samples (for example the so-called Arrott's cylinder) with micrometer and sub-micrometer sizes. Commissioned in 1978, Arrott designed the Thermal Neutron Facility at the TRIUMF cyclotron.

Recognition
1951: Allis-Chalmers Fellowship in Magnetism
1963: Guggenheim Fellowship in Physics
1982: Gold Medal for Physical Sciences from the Science Council of British Columbia
1986: Medal for Lifetime Achievement in Physics from the Canadian Association of Physicists

References

External links
Personal webpage at Simon Fraser University

1928 births
Living people
20th-century American physicists
Academic staff of Simon Fraser University
American emigrants to Canada
Carnegie Mellon University alumni
Scientists from Pittsburgh
Canadian physicists